Van. is the fourth solo album and second original studio album from Japanese singer Tomiko Van. It was released on December 10, 2008 and contains the title tracks of all four of her solo singles, as well as two b-sides and five new tracks, for an overall total of eleven tracks.

Track listing

CD
Catalog number: AVCD-23712

 Flower
 Utopia
 manacles
 Brave
 Yumeji (夢路; Dream Road)
 carry out
 Senkou (閃光; Glint)
 message.
 Tokyo Biyori (東京日和; Tokyo Weather)
 Refrain
 Van. (Instrumental Track)

DVD

 Flower
 Senkou
 Yumeji
 Tokyo Biyori
 Flower (a-nation)

Charts

References

External links
 mu-mo page 

2008 albums
Tomiko Van albums